I Cesaroni ("The Cesaronis") is an Italian television series produced between 2006 and 2014 by Publispei and Mediaset RTI, inspired by the Spanish series Los Serrano (produced by Globomedia and Telecinco). The series was broadcast in Italy, Portugal, the Czech Republic, Greece and Turkey. In Italy, six seasons of the series were aired.

Episodes

Season 1 (2006)

Season 2 (2008)

Season 3 (2009)

Season 4 (2010)

Season 5 (2012)

Season 6 (2014)

Awards
In 2007, I Cesaroni won the Telegatto as Best TV Series.

On March 29, 2008, I Cesaroni won the RAI Oscar della TV as "Best TV Series of the Year 2007/2008".

On November 30, 2008, the show won the Nickelodeon Kids' Choice Awards as Best TV Series.

On July 11, 2009, at the Rome Fiction Fest, the readers of the popular magazine TV Sorrisi e Canzoni awarded I Cesaroni as Best TV Series and Alessandra Mastronardi as Best Actress.

The movie 
After the great success of the TV show, in 2008 the idea of making a movie out of it came up for the first time. In this movie the main characters would have been Alessandra Mastronardi and Matteo Branciamore, the "young ones" of the show. The plan was to separate the general plot of the movie from the plot of the TV show, even if the characters remain the same.

The event "Day of I Cesaroni" took place at the movies in Italy on 15 May 2008; it consisted of a special piece of 85 minutes about Marcos and Eva in 12 Italian movie theatres. The event served as a preview of the interest the audience had in a future longer movie.

See also
List of Italian television series

References

External links
 

Italian television series
2006 Italian television series debuts
2014 Italian television series endings
Italian television series based on Spanish television series
Canale 5 original programming